Microsynodontis batesii is a species of upside-down catfish native to rivers of Cameroon, the Democratic Republic of the Congo and Gabon.  This species grows to a length of  SL.

References

 
 

Mochokidae
Fish described in 1903
Catfish of Africa
Freshwater fish of Cameroon
Fish of the Democratic Republic of the Congo
Fish of Gabon